Carbon Glacier is located on the north slope of Mount Rainier in the U.S. state of Washington and is the source of the Carbon River. The glacier also has the greatest length, thickness and volume of any U.S. glacier outside of Alaska.

Carbon Glacier is accessible from the northwest Carbon River entrance of Mount Rainier National Park, just outside the town of Carbonado, Washington. The glacier is accessible on foot via an  hike from the Carbon River entrance of Mt. Rainier National Park. The road and trail is currently washed out in several areas due to flooding of the Carbon River in 2006.

See also
List of glaciers in the United States

References

Glaciers of Mount Rainier
Glaciers of Washington (state)